Whanganui (known as Wanganui until 1996) is a New Zealand parliamentary electorate. It was first established in 1860 for the 3rd Parliament and has existed continuously since then.

It is held by Steph Lewis of the Labour Party, who won it in the 2020 general election.

Establishment
In the 1860 electoral redistribution, the House of Representatives increased the number of representatives by 12, reflecting the immense population growth since the original electorates were established in 1853. The redistribution created 15 additional electorates with between one and three members, and the  electorate was split into two separate electorates: the  electorate and the Wanganui electorate, with one member each.

Population centres
The current electorate is based on the urban area of Whanganui, the towns Ōpunake and Hāwera, and smaller centres Kaponga, Eltham, Normanby, Manaia, Patea and Waverley; broadly speaking, the Whanganui and South Taranaki local government districts.

History
Henry Shafto Harrison was the first representative. His 7 February 1861 election was declared invalid. He then served the electorate until the end of the term in 1866.

The nomination meeting was held on Friday, 2 March 1866. Harrison, Bryce and Garner received 51, 102 and 7 votes, respectively, at the election on the following day. Bryce was thus declared elected. Bryce resigned in 1867.

The resulting 6 May  was won by Harrison, and he served until the dissolution of Parliament on 30 December 1870.

Bryce was again elected in the 30 January . This time, he served three parliamentary terms until the dissolution in November 1881.

Wanganui became a two-member electorate for the 12 January 1876 election. Apart from Bryce, Julius Vogel was elected, who was later to become Premier. Vogel resigned on 9 September 1876. 

The resulting 2 October  was won by William Fox, resulting in his second period of representation of a Whanganui-centred electorate. He served until the end of the term on 15 August 1879.

They both server until the end of the term, with Parliament being dissolved on 8 November 1881. 

The election, held on 9 December, was won by William Hogg Watt. He served until the end of the term, with Parliament being dissolved on 27 June 1884.

The  was once again won by John Ballance. This time, he would serve in three successive Parliaments. He died in office on 27 April 1893 during the 11th Parliament. The Liberal Government of New Zealand would last for 21 years and is the longest serving government in New Zealand's history.

He served one term.

Veitch had a long career in the electorate, serving until 1935, when he defeated. He was initially an Independent, but joined the Liberal Party in 1925, and changed to the United Party in 1928.

He also had a long career, retiring in 1960 from the Wanganui seat.

Russell Marshall served six terms and retired in 1990.

He retired in 1993 and died two years after that.

She was the first woman to represent Wanganui. Pettis served an additional term as a List MP until 2008. Borrows announced in 2016 that he would not seek reelection at the 2017 general election and the seat was won by Harete Hipango, retaining it for the National Party. She however, was defeated after one term by Labour's Steph Lewis.

Several members (Fox, Vogel and Ballance) became Premier.

Members of Parliament
Unless otherwise stated, all MPs terms began and ended at a general election.

Key

single-member electorate

multi-member electorate

single-member electorate

List MPs

Members of Parliament elected from party lists in elections where that person also unsuccessfully contested the electorate. Unless otherwise stated, all MPs terms began and ended at general elections.

Election results

2020 election

2017 election

2014 election

2011 election

Electorate (as at 11 November 2011): 43,350

2008 election

2005 election

1999 election
Refer to Candidates in the New Zealand general election 1999 by electorate#Whanganui for a list of candidates.

1993 election

1990 election

1987 election

1984 election

1981 election

1978 election

1975 election

1972 election

1969 election

1966 election

1963 election

1960 election

1957 election

1954 election

1951 election

1949 election

1946 election

1943 election

1938 election

1935 election

1931 election

1928 election

1925 election

1922 election

1919 election

1914 election

1911 election

 
 
 
 
 
 
|-
! style="background-color:#E9E9E9" ! colspan="6" style="text-align:left;" |Second ballot result
|-

1908 election

 
 
 
 
 
 
|-
! style="background-color:#E9E9E9" ! colspan="6" style="text-align:left;" |Second ballot result
|-

1899 election

1893 by-election

1890 election

1887 election

1884 election

1881 election

1879 election

1876 by-election

1867 by-election

Notes

References

Bibliography

External links
Electorate Profile  Parliamentary Library

New Zealand electorates
1860 establishments in New Zealand
Politics of Manawatū-Whanganui